Predicament is a 2008 Iranian Crime-drama film written and directed by Mohammad Ali Sadjadi.

Plot 
Capt. Reza Shemirani (Mahdi Pakdel) and his colleagues are involved in unusual robberies. Amir Delavari (Masoud Rayegan) is a thief who has a special skill in theft and special relations with his subordinates. One of the Delavari accomplices is injured during the robbery and...

Cast 
 Masoud Rayegan
 Mahdi Pakdel
 Shahram Haghighat Doost
 Laleh Eskandari
 Farhad Ghaemian
 Soraya Ghasemi
 Maryam Kavyani
 Farhad Besharati
 Amir Reza Delavari
 Masoumeh Mirhosseini
 Mehdi Mayamei
 Shiva Khosromehr
 Pooya Delavari
 Hamid Safayi

References

External links

2008 films
2000s Persian-language films
Iranian crime films